The Beer–Lambert law, also known as Beer's law, the Lambert–Beer law, or the Beer–Lambert–Bouguer law relates the attenuation of light to the properties of the material through which the light is travelling. The law is commonly applied to chemical analysis measurements and used in understanding attenuation in physical optics, for photons, neutrons, or rarefied gases. In mathematical physics, this law arises as a solution of the BGK equation.

History 
The law was discovered by Pierre Bouguer before 1729, while looking at red wine, during a brief vacation in Alentejo, Portugal. It is often attributed to Johann Heinrich Lambert, who cited Bouguer's Essai d'optique sur la gradation de la lumière (Claude Jombert, Paris, 1729) – and even quoted from it – in his Photometria in 1760. Lambert's law stated that the loss of light intensity when it propagates in a medium is directly proportional to intensity and path length. Much later, the German scientist August Beer discovered another attenuation relation in 1852. Beer's law stated that the transmittance of a solution remains constant if the product of concentration and path length stays constant. The modern derivation of the Beer–Lambert law combines the two laws and correlates the absorbance, which is the negative decadic logarithm of the transmittance, to both the concentrations of the attenuating species and the thickness of the material sample. The first modern formulation was given possibly by Robert Luther and Andreas Nikolopulos in 1913.

Mathematical formulation 
A common and practical expression of the Beer–Lambert law relates the optical attenuation of a physical material containing a single attenuating species of uniform concentration to the optical path length through the sample and absorptivity of the species. This expression is:

Where
 is the absorbance
 is the molar attenuation coefficient or absorptivity of the attenuating species
 is the optical path length
 is the concentration of the attenuating species

A more general form of the Beer–Lambert law states that, for  attenuating species in the material sample,

or equivalently that

where
 is the attenuation cross section of the attenuating species  in the material sample;
 is the number density of the attenuating species  in the material sample;
is the molar attenuation coefficient or absorptivity of the attenuating species  in the material sample;
 is the amount concentration of the attenuating species  in the material sample;
 is the path length of the beam of light through the material sample.

In the above equations, the transmittance  of material sample is related to its optical depth  and to its absorbance A by the following definition

where
 is the radiant flux transmitted by that material sample;
is the radiant flux received by that material sample.

Attenuation cross section and molar attenuation coefficient are related by

and number density and amount concentration by

where  is the Avogadro constant.

In case of uniform attenuation, these relations become

or equivalently

Cases of non-uniform attenuation occur in atmospheric science applications and radiation shielding theory for instance.

The law tends to break down at very high concentrations, especially if the material is highly scattering. Absorbance within range of 0.2 to 0.5 is ideal to maintain linearity in the Beer–Lambart law. If the radiation is especially intense, nonlinear optical processes can also cause variances. The main reason, however, is that the concentration dependence is in general non-linear and Beer's law is valid only under certain conditions as shown by derivation below. For strong oscillators and at high concentrations the deviations are stronger. If the molecules are closer to each other interactions can set in. These interactions can be roughly divided into physical and chemical interactions. Physical interaction do not alter the polarizability of the molecules as long as the interaction is not so strong that light and molecular quantum state intermix (strong coupling), but cause the attenuation cross sections to be non-additive via electromagnetic coupling. Chemical interactions in contrast change the polarizability and thus absorption.

Expression with attenuation coefficient 
The Beer–Lambert law can be expressed in terms of attenuation coefficient, but in this case is better called Lambert's law since amount concentration, from Beer's law, is hidden inside the attenuation coefficient. The (Napierian) attenuation coefficient  and the decadic attenuation coefficient  of a material sample are related to its number densities and amount concentrations as

respectively, by definition of attenuation cross section and molar attenuation coefficient. Then the Beer–Lambert law becomes

and

In case of uniform attenuation, these relations become

or equivalently

where the attenuation is usually an addition of absorption coefficient  (creation of electron-hole pairs) or scattering (for example Rayleigh scattering if the scattering centers are much smaller than the incident wavelength). Also note that for some systems we can put  (1 over inelastic mean free path) in place of

Derivation 
Assume that a beam of light enters a material sample. Define z as an axis parallel to the direction of the beam. Divide the material sample into thin slices, perpendicular to the beam of light, with thickness dz sufficiently small that one particle in a slice cannot obscure another particle in the same slice when viewed along the z direction.

The attenuation is caused by the photons that did not make it to the other side of the slice because of scattering or absorption. The solution to this differential equation is obtained by multiplying the integrating factor

throughout to obtain

which simplifies due to the product rule (applied backwards) to

Integrating both sides and solving for Φe for a material of real thickness ℓ, with the incident radiant flux upon the slice  and the transmitted radiant flux  gives

and finally

To describe the attenuation coefficient in a way independent of the number densities ni of the N attenuating species of the material sample, one introduces the attenuation cross section . σi has the dimension of an area; it expresses the likelihood of interaction between the particles of the beam and the particles of the specie i in the material sample:

One can also use the molar attenuation coefficients , where NA is the Avogadro constant, to describe the attenuation coefficient in a way independent of the amount concentrations  of the attenuating species of the material sample:

Validity 
Under certain conditions the Beer–Lambert law fails to maintain a linear relationship between attenuation and concentration of analyte. These deviations are classified into three categories:
 Real—fundamental deviations due to the limitations of the law itself.
 Chemical—deviations observed due to specific chemical species of the sample which is being analyzed.
 Instrument—deviations which occur due to how the attenuation measurements are made.

There are at least six conditions that need to be fulfilled in order for the Beer–Lambert law to be valid. These are:
 The attenuators must act independently of each other.
 The attenuating medium must be homogeneous in the interaction volume.
 The attenuating medium must not scatter the radiation—no turbidity—unless this is accounted for as in DOAS.
 The incident radiation must consist of parallel rays, each traversing the same length in the absorbing medium.
 The incident radiation should preferably be monochromatic, or have at least a width that is narrower than that of the attenuating transition. Otherwise a spectrometer as detector for the power is needed instead of a photodiode which cannot discriminate between wavelengths.
 The incident flux must not influence the atoms or molecules; it should only act as a non-invasive probe of the species under study. In particular, this implies that the light should not cause optical saturation or optical pumping, since such effects will deplete the lower level and possibly give rise to stimulated emission.

If any of these conditions are not fulfilled, there will be deviations from the Beer–Lambert law.

Chemical analysis by spectrophotometry 
The Beer–Lambert law can be applied to the analysis of a mixture by spectrophotometry, without the need for extensive pre-processing of the sample. An example is the determination of bilirubin in blood plasma samples. The spectrum of pure bilirubin is known, so the molar attenuation coefficient ε is known. Measurements of decadic attenuation coefficient μ10 are made at one wavelength λ that is nearly unique for bilirubin and at a second wavelength in order to correct for possible interferences. The amount concentration c is then given by

For a more complicated example, consider a mixture in solution containing two species at amount concentrations c1 and c2. The decadic attenuation coefficient at any wavelength λ is, given by

Therefore, measurements at two wavelengths yields two equations in two unknowns and will suffice to determine the amount concentrations c1 and c2 as long as the molar attenuation coefficient of the two components, ε1 and ε2 are known at both wavelengths. This two system equation can be solved using Cramer's rule. In practice it is better to use linear least squares to determine the two amount concentrations from measurements made at more than two wavelengths. Mixtures containing more than two components can be analyzed in the same way, using a minimum of N wavelengths for a mixture containing N components.

The law is used widely in infra-red spectroscopy and near-infrared spectroscopy for analysis of polymer degradation and oxidation (also in biological tissue) as well as to measure the concentration of various compounds in different food samples. The carbonyl group attenuation at about 6 micrometres can be detected quite easily, and degree of oxidation of the polymer calculated.

Application for the atmosphere 
This law is also applied to describe the attenuation of solar or stellar radiation as it travels through the atmosphere. In this case, there is scattering of radiation as well as absorption. The Beer–Lambert law for the atmosphere is usually written

where each τx is the optical depth whose subscript identifies the source of the absorption or scattering it describes:
 a refers to aerosols (that absorb and scatter);
 g are uniformly mixed gases (mainly carbon dioxide (CO2)  and molecular oxygen (O2) which only absorb);
 NO2 is nitrogen dioxide, mainly due to urban pollution (absorption only);
 RS are effects due to Raman scattering in the atmosphere;
 w is water vapour absorption;
 O3 is ozone (absorption only);
 r is Rayleigh scattering from molecular oxygen (O2) and nitrogen (N2) (responsible for the blue color of the sky);
 the selection of the attenuators which have to be considered depends on the wavelength range and can include various other compounds. This can include tetraoxygen, HONO, formaldehyde, glyoxal, a series of halogen radicals and others.

m is the optical mass or airmass factor, a term approximately equal (for small and moderate values of θ) to 1/cos θ, where θ is the observed object's zenith angle (the angle measured from the direction perpendicular to the Earth's surface at the observation site). This equation can be used to retrieve τa, the aerosol optical thickness, which is necessary for the correction of satellite images and also important in accounting for the role of aerosols in climate.

See also 

 Applied spectroscopy
 Atomic absorption spectroscopy
 Absorption spectroscopy
 Cavity ring-down spectroscopy
 Clausius-Mossotti relation
 Infra-red spectroscopy
 Job plot
 Laser absorption spectrometry
 Lorentz-Lorenz relation
 Logarithm
 Polymer degradation
 Scientific laws named after people
 Quantification of nucleic acids
 Tunable diode laser absorption spectroscopy
 Transmittance#Beer–Lambert law

References

External links 
 Beer–Lambert Law Calculator

 Beer–Lambert Law Simpler Explanation

Scattering, absorption and radiative transfer (optics)
Spectroscopy
Electromagnetic radiation
Visibility